The second season of Myanmar Idol premiered on December 2, 2016 and continued until March 25, 2017. It was won by Thar Nge. The second season was co-hosted by Kyaw Htet Aung, the latter of whom left the show after the season ended.

Regional auditions
Auditions were held in Nay Pyi Taw, Mandalay, Taunggyi, Hpa-an, and Yangon from September to October 2016, and around 10,000 attended the auditions.

Structure of auditions
There are usually two stages in the audition process. The first round is casting round and they sing in front the executive producers and more are eliminated. In the second round those who survive the first stage sing in front of the judges and this is the audition shown on television. Those who gain at least two "yes" votes from the three judges then receive a golden ticket to Golden Week.

Golden Week
It featured three rounds: Round 1, Group Round, and Solo Round.  In the first round, each contestant sang individually, and after they sang, they gathered in a line. Those who impressed the judges advanced to the next round where the contestants performed in groups of four or five, singing a song together. The remaining auditionees who passed the group rounds performed their final solos to advance in the Green Mile.

Top 10 Finalists and stages
Ye Naung, Thar Nge, Zin Gyi, Mai Mai Seng, Chan Nyein, Poe Mi, A Mi Zan, Phyu Lay, Billy La Min Aye, Yoon

Color key:

Week 1: Top 10–

Week 2: Top 9 – 1990s

Week 3: Top 8 – Duet songs
Poe Mi was saved by judges. So there was no elimination in this week.
Color key:

Week 4: Top 8 – Rock Music
Double elimination because Poe Mi was saved by judges in previous week.

Week 5: Top 6 – Win Oo's songs

Week 6: Top 5 – Popular songs

Week 7: Top 4 + Wild Card winner – Blues Music
Double eliminated because Zin Gyi was returned by Wild Card.

Week 8: Top 3 – Strong Music

Week 9: Finale
The Top two performed their winner’s song Judges chose song and contestants chose themselves song.

Elimination Chart

References

Myanmar Idol
2016 television seasons
2017 television seasons